Nellikunnu Abdul Khader Mohammed Kunhi, known as N. A. Nellikkunnu is a member of the current 15th Legislative Assembly of Kerala. He represents the Kasaragod assembly constituency of Kerala and is currently a member of the Indian Union Muslim League.

Career 
Nellikkunnu entered politics through Muslim Students' Federation and later became the secretary of its Kasaragod Government College unit. He was also the Secretary of Kasaragod Taluk Committee, and Muslim Youth League, Kasaragod. He is a state council member of Muslim League, and General Secretary of Muslim League Municipal Committee, Kasaragod.

He was also first Correspondent of Chandrika Daily in U.A.E. and the founding Secretary of Chandrika Readers Forum, Dubai.

He is currently a working committee member of I.U.M.L State Committee, President of Agriculturist Welfare Co-operative Society, Kasaragod; and the Manager of Anvarul Uloom A.U.P. School, Nellikkunnu, Kasaragod.

References

External links
 N.A. NELLIKKUNNU wins at Kasaragod for 9738 votes 

Living people
1954 births
People from Kasaragod district
Malayali politicians
Indian Union Muslim League politicians
Kerala MLAs 2016–2021
Kerala MLAs 2011–2016